Josef "Harry" Jelinek (1905–1982) was a Czechoslovak con artist and publisher of Nazi propaganda, who is reputed to have fraudulently sold the Karlštejn Castle to American industrialists in 1945.

Biography
Jelinek was born 14 October 1905 in Vlašim, Austria-Hungary and died in Guarene d'Alba, Italy in 1982.

References

Further reading
 Kolektiv: Slovník odpovědných redaktorů a šéfredaktorů legálního českého denního tisku v letech 1939 až 1945, Charles University in Prague : Prague 2007.
 Tomáš Pasák: Soupis legálních novin, časopisů a úředních věstníků v českých zemích z let 1939-1945. Charles University in Prague in 1979.
 Jana Čechurová: Podvodník velkého stylu Harry Jelínek, in Falza a podvody české historie. Akropolis Prague 2001.
 Arno Bělohlávek, Karel Dobeš : Neprodal jen Karlštejn. Mladá fronta Praha 1984

1905 births
1982 deaths
People from Vlašim
Confidence tricksters
Czechoslovak fraudsters
Impostors
Czechoslovak emigrants to Italy